Olafs Kļaviņš (born 7 February 1964) is a Latvian former bobsledder. He competed in the four man event at the 1988 Winter Olympics, representing the Soviet Union.

References

1964 births
Living people
People from Saldus
Latvian male bobsledders
Olympic bobsledders of the Soviet Union
Bobsledders at the 1988 Winter Olympics